João Tiago Oliveira Rodrigues (born 15 March 1988), simply known as Carela is a retired Portuguese footballer who played as a right back.

External links 
 
 

1988 births
Living people
People from Ovar
Association football defenders
Portuguese footballers
S.C. Espinho players
C.D. Estarreja players
U.D. Oliveirense players
FC Pampilhosa players
SC São João de Ver players
Segunda Divisão players
Liga Portugal 2 players
Sportspeople from Aveiro District